Irma Patkós (8 March 1900 – 24 October 1996) was a Hungarian film actress. She appeared in 40 films between 1957 and 1994.

Selected filmography
 A Strange Role (1976)
 My Father's Happy Years (1977)
 Cserepek (1980)
 Sweet Emma, Dear Böbe (1992)

External links

1900 births
1996 deaths
Hungarian film actresses
20th-century Hungarian actresses